Peter Panton (born 3 June 1932) is a former Australian racing cyclist. He finished in second place in the Australian National Road Race Championships in 1958. He was also winner of the Sun Tour in 1959 and 1960.

References

External links

1932 births
Living people
Australian male cyclists
Place of birth missing (living people)